An Ocean Between Us is the fourth album by the American metalcore band As I Lay Dying, released on August 21, 2007, by Metal Blade Records. It debuted at No. 8 on the Billboard 200, with sales close to 39,500. The album includes the singles "Nothing Left", "The Sound of Truth", "Within Destruction", "I Never Wanted" and "An Ocean Between Us", with music videos produced for all five.

Reception 

The record was released on August 21, 2007, to generally positive acclaim, peaking at No. 8 on the Billboard 200.

Musical style 
The guitarist, Nick Hipa, said of  the direction of the album, "Collectively we've all pushed ourselves, and we're all doing things that we weren't even capable of doing on the last record. And on top of just experimenting and trying different things, I think we just wrote some pretty sick jams, so I'm happy with it. That's all I can say. For kids who like our band and think they know what to expect from us, it might throw them off a little bit . . . I encourage anybody who likes our band to approach this album with an open mind."

The vocalist, Tim Lambesis, also said, "(We) spent some time listening to our last album [2005's Shadows Are Security] and, just from being on tour, we became a little bit jaded by how the genre — as a whole — has sort of copied itself over and over again. We decided we wanted to be more diverse, even down to the point where we sort of felt like we should really focus on writing songs in different categories, and then pick the best songs from those categories and use them for the record."

Track listing

Personnel 
Production and performance credits are adapted from the album liner notes.

As I Lay Dying 
 Tim Lambesis – lead vocals
 Nick Hipa – lead guitar, backing vocals on "Bury Us All"
 Phil Sgrosso – rhythm guitar, backing vocals, piano, synthesizer
 Jordan Mancino – drums

Additional musicians
 Josh Gilbert – bass, clean vocals on "An Ocean Between Us", "Forsaken", "I Never Wanted", "The Sound of Truth", "Wrath Upon Ourselves"
 Chad Ackerman – backing vocals on "An Ocean Between Us", "Bury Us All"
 Tommy Garcia – backing vocals on "Forsaken"
 Duane Reed – backing vocals on "Forsaken"

Production
 Adam Dutkiewicz – production
 Daniel Castleman – assisting production, mixing on "Departed"
 Colin Richardson – mixing all tracks except "Departed"
 Matt Hyde – mix engineer
 Andy Sneap – guitar re-amping
 Ted Jensen – mastering
 Jacob Bannon – artwork, layout

Charts

References 

2007 albums
Albums produced by Adam Dutkiewicz
Albums with cover art by Jacob Bannon
As I Lay Dying (band) albums
Metal Blade Records albums